The 1984 Jordanian  League (known as The Jordanian  League, was the 34th season of Jordan League since its inception in 1944. Amman SC won its first title.
The 1984 Jordan League season saw 12 teams in competition.

Teams

Map

League standings

References
RSSSF

Jordanian Pro League seasons
Jordan
Jordan
football